W. A. Robinson may refer to:

 William Alfred Robinson (Australian politician)
 Walter Allen Robinson, British administrator
 W. Andrew Robinson, British author